{|

{{Infobox ship career
|Hide header=
|Ship name=*Georg Adolf Kühling (1929–30)Fritz Hincke (1930–41)
|Ship owner=*Hochseefischerei J. Wieting AG (1929–34)
Deutsche Nordsee Hochseefischerei (1934–39)
Kriegsmarine (1939–41)
|Ship operator=*Nordsee Deutsche Hochseefischerei Bremen-Cuxhaven AG (1929–39)
Kriegsmarine (1939–41)
|Ship registry=* Wesermünde, Germany (1929–33)
 Wesermünde, Germany (1933–39)
 (1939–41)
|Ship route=
|Ship ordered=
|Ship builder=Deschimag
|Ship original cost=
|Ship yard number=479
|Ship way number=
|Ship laid down=
|Ship launched=August 1929
|Ship completed=7 September 1929
|Ship christened=
|Ship acquired=
|Ship maiden voyage=
|Ship in service=
|Ship out of service=5 January 1941
|Ship identification=*Code Letters QVNG (1929–34)

Fishing boat registration BX 206 (1929–30)
Fishing boat registration ON 139 (1930–34)
Code Letters DNOO (1934–41)

Fishing boat registration PG 474 (1934–39)
Pennant Number V 306 (1939–41)
|Ship fate=Struck a mine and sank
|Ship notes=
}}

|}

V 306 Fritz Hincke was a German fishing trawler that was requisitioned in the Second World War for use as a vorpostenboot. She was built in 1929 as Georg Adolf Kühling and was renamed in 1930. She struck a mine and sank in January 1941.

Description
The engine was made by Deschimag Seebeckwerft, Wesermünde. It was rated at 65nhp. The engine powered a single screw propeller driven via a geared low pressure turbine.

HistoryGeorg Adolf Kühling was built as yard number 479 by Deschimag Seebeckwerfte, Wesermünde for the Hochseefischerei J. Wieting AG., Wesermünde. She was launched in August 1929 and completed on 7 September. Operated under the management of the Nordsee Deutsche Hochseefischerei Bremen-Cuxhaven AG, the Code Letters QVNG were allocated, as was the fishing boat registration BX 206. On 16 June 1930, her registration was changed to ON 139. On 24 October she was renamed Fritz Hincke. In 1934, her Code Letters were changed to DNOO. On 4 September 1934, her registration was changed to PG 474. She was sold to her managers on 10 November.

On 23 September 1939, Fritz Hincke was requistioned by the Kriegsmarine for use as a Vorpostenboot. She was allocated to 3 Vorpostenflotille as V 306 Fritz Hincke''.

References

Sources

1929 ships
Ships built in Bremen (state)
Fishing vessels of Germany
Steamships of Germany
World War II merchant ships of Germany
Auxiliary ships of the Kriegsmarine
Maritime incidents in January 1941
Ships sunk by mines
World War II shipwrecks in the North Sea